Aderus is a genus of leaf beetles of the family Aderidae that resemble ants. The genus was named by John Obadiah Westwood in 1829.

Species
 Aderus brevicornis (Perris, 1869)
 Aderus brunnipennis (LeConte, 1875) i c g b
 Aderus feai (Pic, 1906)
 Aderus lemoulti (Pic, 1909) g
 Aderus multinotatus (Pic, 1920) g
 Aderus nigrinus (Germar, 1831) (= Anidorus nigrinus)
 Aderus nitidifrons (Thomson, 1886) (= Pseudeuglenes pentatomus)
 Aderus oculatus (Paykull, 1798)
 Aderus pentatomus (Thomson, 1864)
 Aderus populneus (Panzer, 1796) i c g b
 Aderus pygmaeus (Degeer)
 Aderus saginatus (Casey, 1895)
 Aderus saginatus (Casey, 1895) i c g
 Aderus tantillus (Champion, 1890) i c g b
Data sources: i = ITIS, c = Catalogue of Life, g = GBIF, b = Bugguide.net

References

External links
 Genus Aderus (Aderidae): atlas of beetles of Russia

Tenebrionoidea genera
Aderidae